The Tennis Court Oath is a 1962 poetry collection by the American writer John Ashbery. Ashbery lived in Paris when it was published, working as an art critic. The book received few and negative reviews upon its original publication.

See also
 1962 in poetry
 American literature

References

1962 poetry books
American poetry collections
Poetry by John Ashbery